Eat Sleep Play, Inc. was an American video game developer, formed in 2007 by Scott Campbell and David Jaffe, director of the Twisted Metal series and God of War. Eat Sleep Play entered into an exclusive platform deal with Sony requiring the completion of either three console/handheld games or three years of development time, with plans to release its first original game in 2010. The first game released by Eat Sleep Play was a port of the PSP game Twisted Metal: Head On that was retitled as Twisted Metal Head-On: Extra Twisted Edition for PlayStation 2 and was not one of the three game console exclusive deal.

Following his work on Sony Computer Entertainment Santa Monica's God of War (PS2), Scott and Jaffe expressed a desire to focus on smaller-scale, more personal games. They then directed the PlayStation Network game Calling All Cars! (PS3), developed by Incognito.

The company was stationed in Salt Lake City, Utah, USA. The team was largely composed of original members of SingleTrac who made the first two Twisted Metal games.

David Jaffe and Eat Sleep Play developed a new Twisted Metal game, which was released in 2012.

Since Jaffe's resignation in 2012, Eat Sleep Play has moved into mobile game development. In partnership with Zynga the companies have released Running With Friends, Looney Tunes Dash!, and most recently, Ice Age Arctic Blast.

In late 2016, they joined the VR start-up castAR. On June 26, 2017, Eat Sleep Play was shut down along with castAR when it laid off staff and closed its doors and moved to Avalanche Software.

Games

References

2007 establishments in Utah
2017 disestablishments in Utah
American companies established in 2007
Companies based in Salt Lake City
Defunct companies based in Utah
Defunct video game companies of the United States
Privately held companies based in Utah
Video game companies based in Utah
Video game companies disestablished in 2017
Video game companies established in 2007
Video game development companies